Pulzar FM is an independent radio station based in Christchurch, New Zealand. It broadcasts on 100.9 FM, and targets at a youth demographic with a slight male bias, focusing on playing a wide range of the many different genres of dance & electronic music (EDM).

History
Pulzar FM was founded by entrepreneurs Andrew Poulsen and Jason Akehurst in October 1999.

It broadcast as a Low Power FM station on several frequencies in Christchurch but most notably 88.7FM from its foundation in 1999 until November 2007 when the station went into hiatus. During the latter years of broadcast the station broadcast shows by international acts such as Matt Darey, Agnelli & Nelson, and Solarstone.

During 2008 the station founders won and purchased a full power FM frequency in Christchurch and the station resumed broadcast on 105.7FM on 18 April 2009. The relaunched station's format was more pop-oriented than in earlier years.

At 5pm on Wednesday, 7 December 2011, Pulzar FM went off the air due to financial difficulties and the ongoing cost of running. This was mostly due to after effects of the Christchurch earthquakes of 2010 and 2011.

Pulzar FM returned on 19 October 2012 with Jason Akehurst broadcasting for the first hour at mid-day. The first song to play was Monarch by Shapeshifter. The Sleepless4ChildCancer Marathon then began later that day, 75 hours with Snap Campbell and Georgina Stylianou. The official Record attempt kicked off (after an earlier false start) at 10pm on Friday on 105.7 Pulzar FM and ran through to 1am on Tuesday morning beating the previous record of 73 hours. 
Pulzar FM then returned to a similar format to before the December 2011 shutdown, but with Andy Poulsen on the Morning Energy show and Snap Campbell on the drive home.

In 2018, Pulzar FM moved in to the NZME (New Zealand Media & Entertainment) Building in Christchurch after a joint agreement was signed with the company to provide the station with equipment and a brand new studio. The station lives on as a live, local and independent radio station.

In January 2020, Pulzar FM switched from 105.7FM to 93.3FM due to a lack of interest from advertisers.  The station also broadcasts on 100.9FM since 28 September 2020.

Shows
The Pulzar FM breakfast show, 'The Morning Grind', was hosted by station co-owner Andy 'Pulzar' Poulsen from relaunch on 105.7FM on 18 April 2009 until local breakfast radio duo, Josh Armstrong and Gordon Findlater, took the slot in June 2009. The pair introduced a number of unique features for the show including their 'Bad Parenting Update', 'Cafe Giveaway' and 'Pulzar Doctors' segments.

The show joined with the national Family Planning organization for a segment that was named 'Sperm Fest'. Josh, Gordon, Andy and afternoon drive host Lyndon Hunter had tests to figure out who had the highest sperm count. The segment helped to promote sexual health among Christchurch youth.  The Morning Grind was later hosted by Gordon Findlater and Will Appelbe.

After the return of Pulzar FM in October 2012, the Breakfast show 'Morning Energy' was hosted by Andy Poulsen and the drive home show by Snap Campbell. The Hot 30 Countdown with Leyla Hutchison also returned on 27 October, with Gangnam Style voted as Number 1 on the countdown. 

Pulzar FM is the NZ home for shows by a number of the world's top international DJ's, including Tiësto's Club Life, Armin van Buuren's A State of Trance, Nicole Moudaber's In The Mood,  Solarstone's Pure Trance Radio, John Digweed's Transitions, Mark Knight's Toolroom, Paul Oakenfold's Planet Perfecto, Nicky Romero's Protocol Radio, Adam Beyer's Drumcode Live, Alison Wonderland's Radio Wonderland, Sister Bliss' In Session, and UMF Radio.

The Breakfast show is currently called the "Banging Breakfast" and has been hosted by Mike Nicholas since 2016 alongside co-hosts Hannah Smith (2016–17) and Ella McLeod (2017-18). The show's features include Fresh Cuts in Focus (sponsored by NZ on Air), Entertainment News, Tabasco or Truth and the Yes or No Game. Special guests have included Darude, Kings, Truth, Maya Payne, Skymachine and Urzila Carlson.

References

External links
 Pulzar FM (official website)

Radio stations in Christchurch